The Orinda Formation is a Miocene epoch geologic formation in the Berkeley Hills of the East Bay region of the San Francisco Bay Area, California.

It is found within Alameda County and Contra Costa County.

Geology
The Orinda Formation is a coarse alluvial conglomerates sedimentary formation. It underlies the volcanic Moraga Formation.

It preserves fossils dating back to the Miocene epoch of the Neogene period.

Geologic Hazards
The Orinda Formation is prone to landsliding due to intrinsic properties such as its weak cohesive strength and low friction angle. Landslides less than or equal to 10 acres in size occur as slides, slumps, and earthflows on dip or parallel to dip slopes. In the formation, landslides greater than or equal to 10 acres in size are common to very common and occur as slumps and slides on anti-dip slopes.

See also

 
 List of fossiliferous stratigraphic units in California
 Paleontology in California

References

Berkeley Hills
Pliocene California
Geologic formations of California
Geology of Alameda County, California
Geology of Contra Costa County, California
Natural history of the California Coast Ranges
Natural history of the San Francisco Bay Area
Pliocene Series of North America